PLH may refer to:
Civil Aviation Authority (Hungary), Polgári Légiközlekedési Hatóság in Hungarian
Plymouth City Airport, IATA code
Liberal Party of Honduras, Partido Liberal de Honduras in Spanish
PLH Architects, a Danish architecture firm
Personal Licence Holder, a status in UK Licensing law
Polska Liga Hokejowa, top ice hockey league in Poland